A hard start is a rocketry term referring to an overpressure condition during start of a rocket engine at ignition. In the worst cases, this takes the form of an unconfined explosion, resulting in damage, or destruction of the engine.

Rocket ignition
Rocket fuels, hypergolic or otherwise, must be introduced into the combustion chamber at the correct rate in order to have a controlled rate of production of hot gas.  A "hard start" indicates that the quantity of combustible propellant that entered the combustion chamber prior to ignition was too large.  The result is an excessive spike of pressure, possibly leading to structural failure or even an explosion.

Avoiding hard starts involves careful timing of the ignition relative to valve timing or varying the mixture ratio so as to limit the maximum pressure that can occur or simply ensuring an adequate ignition source is present well prior to propellant entering the chamber.

Explosions from hard starts usually cannot happen with purely gaseous propellants, since the amount of the gas present in the chamber is limited by the injector area relative to the throat area, and for practical designs, propellant mass escapes too quickly to be an issue.

A famous example of a hard start was the explosion of Wernher von Braun's "1W" engine during a demonstration to General Walter Dornberger on December 21, 1932.  Delayed ignition allowed the chamber to fill with alcohol and liquid oxygen, which exploded violently.  Shrapnel was embedded in the walls, but nobody was hit.

See also

Rocket propellants
Rocketry